Deniz Dimaki (born September 4, 1977) is a triathlete from Greece. She represented Greece in triathlon at the 2008 Summer Olympics.

Career
Dimaki started her competitive career in 1990 as a medium and long-distance runner. She took up triathlon in 2002 and has won the Greek Triathlon Championship a record nine consecutive times (2002–2010) while at the same time she posted top finishes in other sports such as running and cycling.

Top finishes
Her notable results include:

  1st at the 2005 Ierapetra ITU Triathlon Balkan Championships
  3rd at the 2006 Erdek ITU Triathlon European Cup 
  2nd at the 2007 Limassol ITU Triathlon European Cup and Small States of Europe Championships
  3rd at the 2007 Kusadasi ITU Triathlon European Cup
  1st at the 2007 Gallipoli ITU Triathlon European Cup and Balkan Championships
  1st at the 2007 Egirdir ITU Triathlon European Cup
  2nd at the 2007 Split ITU Triathlon European Cup
  2nd at the 2007 Alanya ITU Triathlon Premium European Cup
  3rd at the 2008 Chania ITU Triathlon European Cup 
  3rd at the 2008 Serres ETU Duathlon European Championships
  1st at the 2008 Belgrade ITU Triathlon European Cup and Balkan Championships

Her coach for most of her professional career is  her husband Chris Vaxevanis former marathon champion runner.

Since 2010 Dimaki has returned to long-distance running.

References

External links
 Official website
 ITU Profile Page of Deniz Dimaki
 Greek Triathlon Federation

1977 births
Living people
Greek female triathletes
Olympic triathletes of Greece
Triathletes at the 2008 Summer Olympics
European Games competitors for Greece
Triathletes at the 2015 European Games
21st-century Greek women